Palas Iași is a commercial area in Iași, Romania located in the Civic Centre district, in the vicinity of the emblematic Palace of Culture.

Project
The project also includes  of Class A office space in seven buildings, hotel and a public garden.

See also
Iulius Town Timișoara
Iulius Mall Iași
Iulius Mall Cluj
Iulius Mall Suceava

References

External links

 Palas Iași Official site
 Palas Mall website

Shopping malls in Iași
Parks in Iași
2012 establishments in Romania